Guhisar is a village in Bhind district in Madhya Pradesh.

References

External links 

 http://travelingluck.com/Asia/India/Madhya+Pradesh/_1270778_Guh%C4%ABsar.html#themap
 http://www.maplandia.com/india/madhya-pradesh/bhind/guhisar/
 http://www.fallingrain.com/world/IN/35/Guhisar.html

Villages in Bhind district